Avenir is a Russian Christian male first name. Its feminine version is Avenira. The name is derived from the Biblical Hebrew word abnēr, meaning father (god) is light. Its colloquial variant is Venir.

The diminutives of "Avenir" are Avenirka, Ava, Venya, Vena, Vira, and Vera.

The patronymics derived from "Avenir" are "" (Avenirovich; masculine) and its colloquial form "" (Avenirych), and "" (Avenirovna; feminine).

See also
Abner (name)

References

Notes

Sources
А. В. Суперанская (A. V. Superanskaya). "Современный словарь личных имён: Сравнение. Происхождение. Написание" (Modern Dictionary of First Names: Comparison. Origins. Spelling). Айрис-пресс. Москва, 2005. 
Н. А. Петровский (N. A. Petrovsky). "Словарь русских личных имён" (Dictionary of Russian First Names). ООО Издательство "АСТ". Москва, 2005. 

